This is a complete list of episodes from the animated television show Animal Mechanicals.

Episodes

Season 1 (2007–2008)

Season 2 (2009–2010)

Season 3 (2011)

WildBrain Spark webseries (2019)

 The Buried Treasure
 Shark Attack Prank
 The Great Ocean Wave
 The UFO Invasion
 The Mysterious Sandcastle
 The Pirate Ship
 The Bird Egg
 Building a Treehouse
 Hungry Animals
 Rex Goes Pop!
 Rex's Frozen Tongue!
 Building a Snowball
 Cave In
 Snow Sports!
 Volcano Eruption!

Principal cast

References

External links
 Animal Mechanicals Season 1 Press Kit at halifaxfilm.com
 Animal Mechanicals Season 2 Press Kit at halifaxfilm.com
 

Animal Mechanicals